Ratteen (Ratine) was a thick napped twilled woolen material. Ratteen was produced in France, Italy and Holand.

Varieties 
There are several varieties of course ratteen, such as drugget, baize and frieze. It was produced in various options; for instance, similar to broadcloth, without shearing the pile and, another one was with friezed nap surface. There was also a mix of wool and linen in 50% ratio.

Rattinet 
Rattinet (Ratinet) was a thinner variety of ratteen.

See also 
Frieze (textile)

References 

Woven fabrics
Waulked textiles